All Wound Up may refer to:

 All Wound Up... (album), an album by Godsmack 
 All Wound Up (store), a defunct novelty and toy retailer
 "All Wound Up", a song by Quiet Riot from Down to the Bone
 "All Wound Up", a song by She Wants Revenge from Up and Down